Leonard Firby Edmondson (16 December 1912 – 20 November 2006) was a British trade unionist.

Born in Gateshead, Edmondson was educated at Gateshead Central School, leaving at the age of fifteen. After two years of unemployment and short-term work, he completed an apprenticeship as a fitter with the Concrete Liner Company. He joined the Amalgamated Engineering Union (AEU) and worked for a large number of businesses around the Tyne, generally acting as a shop steward. He was considered a highly skilled negotiator, who persuaded companies to introduce apprenticeships for machinists, and limit overtime.

In 1934, Edmondson joined the National Unemployed Workers Movement and, through this, joined the Independent Labour Party (ILP), remaining a member until the late 1940s, and identifying as being on the left-wing of the trade union movement for the rest of his life. He campaigned in support of the Republicans during the Spanish Civil War, and for maintenance of working conditions during World War II. In 1943, he was elected to the union's Tyneside District Committee, and in 1953 he became the full-time district secretary.

In 1966, Edmondson was elected to the executive committees of both the AEU and the Confederation of Shipbuilding and Engineering Unions (CSEU); he was president of the CSEU in 1976/77. He was also elected to the General Council of the Trades Union Congress, in 1970, serving for eight years. In addition, he served on the Shipbuilding Industry Training Board, the council of Acas, the Royal Commission on Legal Services, Council on Tribunals, Gypsy Council, and Committee of Inquiry into Prison Services.

Edmondson retired from his union work in 1977, and from his remaining roles by 1984, spending his retirement breeding and showing Shetland Sheepdogs, and enjoyed attending the Appleby Horse Fair.

References

1912 births
2006 deaths
Trade unionists from Tyne and Wear
Members of the General Council of the Trades Union Congress
People from Gateshead